Seyed Karim Amiri Firuzkuhi, with the nom de plume, "Amir", was a renowned Iranian poet.

Life 

The son of Sayyid Mustafa Quli Muntazam al-Dawla, Amiri Firuzkuhi was born in Farahabad, Firuzkuh.

His ancestors had been governors and military commanders from the reign of Karim Khan to the end of the Qajar rule, so that their names all included the title of amir, meaning emir or king. His father was a modernist under the Qajar Muzaffar al-Din Shah accompanying the shah to Europe as a commander and dignitary, thus having the opportunity to directly observe the latest developments of Western civilization.

At the age of seven, Karim was taken by his father to Tehran, though this great change in his life tragically coincided with his father's death. His grandfather, Amir Muhammad Husayn Khan Sardar ('General') became an influential guardian for Karim. Amir Muhammad Husayn Khan Sardar is historically noted for receiving the Legion of Honor from France for his translation and implementation of the Belgian military doctrine in Iran as well as the successful siege of Herat in the course of a campaign. He is also the founder of the orphanage school in Tehran, now well known as the Firuzkuhi Elementary School which utilized resources from the Firuzkuh landholdings to privately fund a vocational school for young boys and orphans.

Karim received his primary education in Tehran at the Siruz, Servat, Alliance, and Sultani schools, going on to study logic, theology, and philosophy at the American College in Tehran under the tutelage of teachers such as Aqa 'Abd al-Nabi Kajuri and Aqa sayyid Husayn Mujtahid Kashani.

Karim later pursued private study in the circles of learned scholars such as Vahid Dastgirdi, the director of the Armaghan journal and the president of the Hakim Nizami Literary Society, with whom he studied subjects such as the principles of philosophy, rhetoric, and belles-lettres.

At the age of 28, Karim turned to the traditional sciences, studying six years with Shaykh 'Abd al-Nabi Kujuri, Sayyid Husayn Kashani, Sayyad Kazim 'Assar, Mirza Khalil Kamara'i, and Sayyid Mahmud Imam'i Jum'a with whom he studied Arabic literature, logic, theology, Islamic jurisprudence and the principles of Shi'ite doctrine, and mastered the writing and prose and the composition of poetry in Arabic.

Karim came to head the Documents Registration and Real Estate Administration from 1947 to 1957 but resigned from government service altogether to pursue freelance writing.

His contributions are not limited to the Literary Society of Iran, the Hakim Nizami Literary Society, and the Farhangistan Literary Society.

Amiri Firuzkuhi is associated with scholars, writers, and poets in the likes of Rahi Mo'ayyeri, Bahmanyar, Muhammad 'Ali Bamdad, Vahid Dastgirdi, and Sadegh Hedayat as well as with musicians like Habib Sama'i, Abu al-Hasan Saba, and 'Abd al-Husayn Shahnazi.

Work 
Amiri Firuzkuhi began composing ghazals at the age of twelve. When he discovered Saib Tabrizi he was captivated by his style and, as a result, became a distinguished adherent of the Indian genre of Persian poetry though his ghazals.

His expression in ghazals are straightforward, clear, smooth, and thematic. In his qasidas his rhetoric is reminiscent of Khaqani's lucidity and eloquence, and his poetic nostalgia that of Mas'ud Sa'd. In his qasida composition he intertwines a legacy of the Khurasan genre with developments of the restoration in such a way, bringing grace to qasidas that are predominantly melancholic.

In the eulogy of Islam and the ahl-i bayt the Prophet and his immediate family his idiom is measured, intermixed with Qur'anic terminology, while in his informal poetry, the tone is gentle and passionate, and in his elegies, the tone is intimate and melancholic.

His qit'as stylistically follow on the model of his qasidas, compared with the latter, these verse fragments tend to be apothegms in a more abstruse and archaic style.

He chooses mathnavi [rhyming couplet genre] to set the mood with an expression reminiscent of Nizami. His poetry runs to 3,000 couplets, in the composition of which he exercises the utmost precision and through a diversity of rhymes crafted in a multiplicity of couplets, he provides inventive imagery stemming from the interaction of his thoughts and feelings.

He was acquainted with the subtleties of Persian poetry, which he applied to his compositions in the Indian genre in such forms as ghazal and qasida. He also had a thorough knowledge of Arabic, in which he composed poetry as well.

Legacy 
Amiri Firuzkuhi died in Tehran and is buried in the court of the shrine of Shah 'Abd al-Azim. The majority of his poetic work was composed after he turned fifty. He was celebrated in literary societies throughout Iran, whom he had worked with actively.

His admiration for Saib Tabrizi is not only reflected in his poetry but also in his critical edition of that poet's work which he penned in a detailed introduction. Amiri Firuzkuhi was at odds with the conventional terming of the Saib style as Indian insisting that it was in a separate 'Isfihani' genre.

Apart from his work in ghazal and qasida, he is noted for composing poetry in the form of tarkib-band In contrast to his ghazals, Amiri tended to compose his qasidas in the Khurasani genre, following the precedents of Khaqani, Nasir Khusraw, Mas'ud Sa'd and Anvari.

His poetry is fraught with the bemoaning of life with its evanescence and vicissitudes, along with his own personal lack of fulfillment, his lyrically expressed pain and frustration.

Amiri Firuzkuhi's home in Tehran is known as a haven for the deeply feeling, where cultured people like 'Abd al-Rahman Parsa Tuysirkani, Ahmad Mahdavi Damghani, Habib Yaghma'i, Ghulam Husayn Ra'di Adarkhshi, and prominent classical musicians gathered in a convivial atmosphere for fruitful discussion of poetry, belles-lettres, and art.

Being independently able to live off the proceeds of his inherited lands in Firuzkuh, he could spare his sensitive nature from the burden of the duties of professional involvement with the government. After his death, his daughter Amir Banoo Karimi published his divan in two volumes and made his passionate ghazals available to eager readers.

Amiri's works include translations of texts of the Nahj al-Balagha and Hajj Shaykh Muhaddis Qummi's Nafs al-Mahmum: Wajiza fi 'ilm al-Nabi a philosophical treatise published in the Javidan-i Khirad journal. Other works include two volumes of his own divan, a critical edition of Saib Tabrizi's divan along with an introduction, a Ihqaq al-Haqq in support of the poets of the Safavid era.

References

 Asar-afarinan (1, 303)
 Az Nima ta Ruzigar-i Ma (530-537)
 Sukhvan-i Nami-yi Mu'asir-i Iran (1, 368-375)

See also
Rahi Mo'ayyeri
Amir Banoo Karimi
Ali Mosaffa
Jafar Shahidi

People from Tehran Province
1910 births
1984 deaths
20th-century Iranian poets